Erikssonia may refer to:

Erikssonia (butterfly), a genus of butterflies
Erikssonia (fungus), a genus of fungi